The 1986 Fresno State Bulldogs football team represented California State University, Fresno as a member of the Pacific Coast Athletic Association (PCAA) during the 1986 NCAA Division I-A football season. Led by ninth-year head coach Jim Sweeney, Fresno State compiled an overall record of 9–2 with a mark of 6–1 in conference play, placing second in the PCAA. The Bulldogs played their home games at Bulldog Stadium in Fresno, California.

Schedule

Team players in the NFL
The following were selected in the 1987 NFL Draft.

The following finished their college career in 1986, were not drafted, but played in the NFL.

References

Fresno State
Fresno State Bulldogs football seasons
Fresno State Bulldogs football